Frank Miroslav Filgas (3 November 1926 in County Carlow – 23 February 2006 in County Dublin) was an Irish cricketer. A right-handed batsman and wicket-keeper, he played just once for the Ireland cricket team, a first-class match against Scotland in July 1948.

References

External links

1926 births
2006 deaths
Irish cricketers
Sportspeople from County Carlow
Irish people of Czech descent
Wicket-keepers